Gary Plumley (born 24 March 1956) is an English former professional footballer who played in the Football League for Newport County, Hereford United and Cardiff City, and in the Hong Kong First Division League for Happy Valley.

A goalkeeper, Plumley made 187 appearances for Newport County in four spells with the club between 1976 and 1987. He was part of the team that won the Welsh Cup and were promoted to the Third Division in the 1979–80 season, and in the subsequent season reached the quarter-final of the 1981 European Cup Winners Cup, holding eventual runners-up Carl Zeiss Jena to a draw in the away leg before losing 1–0 at home.

Plumley also played for Hereford United, Cardiff City, Happy Valley and Ebbw Vale.

Plumley's father Eddie was chief executive of Watford, a family connection which led to him making a one-off appearance in the 1987 FA Cup semi-final. Watford goalkeeper Tony Coton broke a finger two weeks before the game leaving manager Graham Taylor needing to find cover for Steve Sherwood after the transfer deadline. In desperation, Taylor suggested to Eddie Plumley that they sign his son, who had by then retired from football. Plumley signed, Sherwood dislocated a finger, so Plumley played; Tottenham Hotspur won the match 4–1. No fee had been agreed at the time but Graham Taylor wanted to pay Plumley. A few weeks later he received a cheque and went straight out and bought a fridge with it. They called it the Watford fridge.

Plumley became an estate agent in Newport. He is married to Debbie Johnsey, who represented Great Britain at show jumping at the 1976 Montreal Olympics. Their daughter Gemma Plumley is also an accomplished show jumper.

References

External links
 

1956 births
Living people
Footballers from Birmingham, West Midlands
English footballers
Association football goalkeepers
Leicester City F.C. players
Newport County A.F.C. players
Happy Valley AA players
Hereford United F.C. players
Cardiff City F.C. players
Ebbw Vale F.C. players
Watford F.C. players
English Football League players
Hong Kong First Division League players
Expatriate footballers in Hong Kong
English expatriate sportspeople in Hong Kong
English expatriate footballers